For Love or Country: The Arturo Sandoval Story is a 2000 American made-for-television biographical drama film about jazz musician Arturo Sandoval starring Andy García. The film was produced for HBO premium cable network and first aired on November 18, 2000.

Plot
World-class trumpeter Arturo Sandoval was a shining light in Cuba's exciting jazz scene and championed by jazz legend Dizzy Gillespie as one of the greatest musicians he had ever heard. The film is the story of Sandoval's life, up to his defection to the United States.

Cast
Andy García as Arturo Sandoval
Mía Maestro as Marianela
Gloria Estefan as Emilia
David Paymer as Embassy interviewer
Charles S. Dutton as Dizzy Gillespie
 Tomas Milian as Sosa
Freddy Rodríguez as Leonel
José Zúñiga as Paquito D'Rivera
Steven Bauer as Angel
Fionnula Flanagan as Sally
Miguel Sandoval as Osvaldo
Fernanda Andrade as Paloma
Arturo Sandoval Valet (uncredited cameo)

External links
 

2000 television films
2000 films
2000s biographical films
American biographical films
Films set in Havana
Biographical films about musicians
HBO Films films
Films directed by Joseph Sargent
Cultural depictions of Cuban men
Cultural depictions of jazz musicians
2000s English-language films
2000s American films